The New Aliyah Party (Aliyah Hadasha lit. New Immigration) was a political party in Mandatory Palestine and Israel.

History
The party was established in 1942 by immigrants from Austria and Germany who had arrived in Palestine during the Fifth Aliyah. The party won 19 seats in the 1944 Assembly of Representatives elections, making it the third largest party after Mapai and the Left Bloc. The party's magazine was named Amudim (lit. Pages).

In May 1948 party leader Pinchas Rosen became a member of the provisional government. At the end of 1948 it merged with several other liberal parties, including the political arm of HaOved HaTzioni, to form the Progressive Party.

References

Political parties in Mandatory Palestine
Defunct political parties in Israel
Political parties established in 1942
1942 establishments in Mandatory Palestine
Political parties disestablished in 1948
1948 disestablishments in Mandatory Palestine
Liberal parties in Israel
Zionist political parties in Israel